Andy Carvin is an American blogger and former senior product manager for online communities at National Public Radio (NPR). He accepted a position at First Look Media in February, 2014. Carvin was the founding editor and former coordinator of the Digital Divide Network, an online community of more than 10,000 Internet activists in over 140 countries working to bridge the digital divide. He is also an active blogger as well as a field correspondent to the vlog Rocketboom.

Carvin lives in Silver Spring, Maryland.

Biography
Born in Boston and raised in Florida, Carvin graduated from Northwestern University in 1993. While working for the Corporation for Public Broadcasting in 1994, he authored the website EdWeb, one of the first websites to advocate the use of the World Wide Web in education.

In 1999, he was hired by the Benton Foundation to help develop Helping.org, a philanthropy website that eventually became known as Networkforgood.org. At the December 1999 US National Digital Divide Summit in Washington DC, President Bill Clinton announced the launch of the Digital Divide Network, a spin-off of Helping.org edited by Carvin.

In 2001, he organized an email forum called SEPT11INFO, an emergency discussion forum in response to the September 11 attacks. Following the Boxing Day tsunami in 2004, he created the  RSS aggregator Tsunami-Info.org, and served as a contributor to the TsunamiHelp collaborative blog. He also joined Global Voices Online in the end of 2004 

In January 2005, Carvin began advocating mobile phone podcasting as a tool for citizen journalism and human rights monitoring; he called the concept "mobcasting". Utilizing free online tools including FeedBurner, Blogger and Audioblogger, Carvin demonstrated the potential of mobcasting at a February 2005 Harvard blogging conference and at The Gates, the Central Park art installation created by the artist Christo. He later demonstrated mobcasting as part of a collaborative blog called Katrina Aftermath, which allowed members of the public to post multimedia content regarding Hurricane Katrina. For Carvin's work on mobcasting and the digital divide, Carvin received a 2005 TR35 award from Technology Review, awarded annually to the 35 leading technology innovators under age 35. Carvin has also been honored as one of the top education technology advocates in eSchool News magazine and District Administration magazine.

In May 2006, Carvin began serving as host on a blog called Learning.now on PBS. According to Learning.now's website, it explores "how new technology and Internet culture affect how educators teach and children learn. It will offer a continuing look at how new technology such as wikis, blogs, vlogs, RSS, podcasts, social networking sites, and the always-on culture of the Internet are impacting teacher and students' lives both inside and out of the classroom." Learning.now is part of PBS TeacherSource, PBS' educator website.

In September 2006, Andy Carvin became a staff member at NPR as their senior product manager for online communities.

An avid Twitter user, the popular revolution in Tunisia in late 2010 caught Andy Carvin's attention when the microblogging service "seemed to explode" with messages about an uprising. Carvin had traveled extensively in Tunisia, had many contacts there, and was able to develop others. Carvin's curation of Twitter feeds as well as traditional wire services have generated a great deal of interest in the journalism community. He has given interviews about his news curation of citizen journalism on blogs, journalism sites, as well as mainstream media sites.

In March 2011, Andy Carvin and his Twitter followers utilized crowdsourced research to debunk false stories that Israeli weapons were being used against the people of Libya.

By April 2011, The Columbia Journalism Review dubbed Carvin a "living, breathing real-time verification system" and suggested his might be the best Twitter account to follow in the world. The Washington Post called him "a one-man Twitter news bureau". His hometown paper, Florida Today, published a profile describing him as having "global impact" and saying he provided "a unique window into the unrest sweeping across the Middle East."

A few days before a foreign policy speech on the Middle East by President Barack Obama in mid-May 2011, the White House contacted Carvin and asked for him to co-host a Twitter interview chat with a White House official. Although NPR had refused to allow the White House to specify particular reporters in the past, Mark Stencel, NPR's managing editor for digital news, granted the request, saying that Carvin was "uniquely suited" for the role.

Carvin was a recipient of the Journalism Awards: Special Distinction Award, Knight-Batten Award for Innovation for his Twitter reporting, July 2011. Link

On August 21, 2011, as armed fighters rolled into the city of Tripoli, Libya, in a bid to oust Muammar Gaddafi from his 42-year rule of the country, cable news stations in the U.S. appeared unprepared to cover the breaking news event, but Carvin tweeted over 800 times, "recording the oral history in real time." He was profiled in Britain's The Guardian newspaper as "the man who tweets revolutions".

The Daily Dot recognized Carvin as second only to online hacktivist group Anonymous in his influence on Twitter in the year 2011. In its writeup of Carvin, the Dot compared him to Edward R. Murrow, whose radio coverage of the London Blitz established him as a household name in the United States during World War II.

On January 25, 2013, Carvin conducted an AMA on Reddit to promote his new book, Distant Witness.

Carvin donated the iPhone he used to tweet during the Arab Spring to the American History Museum.

Notes and references

External links
 Andy Carvin's personal website
 Digital Divide Network
 PBS learning.now (blog)
 EdWeb: Exploring Technology & School Reform
 The Gates @ Central Park
 Mobcasting (blog)
 Katrina Aftermath (blog)
 TsunamiHelp (blog)
 Mind the Gap: The Digital Divide as the Civil Rights Issue of the New Millennium 1999 essay by Andy Carvin, Multimedia Schools magazine
 Andy Carvin's Twitter feed

1971 births
Digital divide activists
Living people
NPR personalities
Non-profit technology
Northwestern University alumni
People from Boston
People from Florida
American reporters and correspondents
Video bloggers
American male bloggers
American bloggers
People from Silver Spring, Maryland
21st-century American non-fiction writers
American YouTubers
Shorty Award winners